Sarat Chandra Roy (4 November 1871– 30 April 1942) was an Indian scholar of anthropology. He is widely regarded as the 'father of Indian ethnography', the 'first Indian ethnographer', and as the 'first Indian anthropologist'.

Early life
Born on 4 November 1871 to Purna Chandra Roy, a member of the Bengal Judicial Service, in a village in Khulna district (now in Bangladesh), young Sarat came in contact with tribal people after his father was posted in Purulia. After his father's death in 1885, he was educated at his maternal uncle's home in Calcutta. In 1892, he graduated in English literature from the General Assembly's Institution (now Scottish Church College). He earned a postgraduate degree in English from the same institution, and subsequently studied law at the Ripon College (now Surendranath College). He had worked for some time as a headmaster at the Mymensingh High School, and later as a principal at the GEL Mission High School in Ranchi. In Ranchi, he became aware of the plight of the tribals. He left teaching and started practicing as a lawyer and became a pleader in the district court in the 24 Parganas in Calcutta in 1897. A year later he moved to Ranchi, where he practiced at the court of the judicial commissioner in Ranchi.

Career in anthropology
His interest into the plight of the "tribal" people developed in the course of his visits as a lawyer, in the interior areas of the Chota Nagpur Division. He was deeply moved by the plight of the Munda, Oraon and other tribal groups, who were subjected to the continued oppression by an apathetic colonial administration, and by a general contempt towards them in courts of law, as "upper-caste" Hindu lawyers had little knowledge of their customs, religions, customary laws and languages. Keeping all this in perspective, he decided to spend years and decades among tribal folks to study their languages, conduct ethnography, and interpret their customs, practices, religion and laws for the benefit of humanity, and also for the established system of colonial civil jurisprudence. In so doing, he wrote pioneering monographs, that would set the ground for broader understanding and future research. Thus although he was not formally trained in either ethnology or anthropology, he is regarded the first Indian ethnologist, or ethnographer or an Indian anthropologist.

In his later years, he spent his time editing Man in India and in other journals, writing and lecturing at the newly established anthropology department at the University of Calcutta, and serving as a reader at Patna University.

Works

Books and monographs
The Mundas and Their Country (1912)
The Oraons of Chota Nagpur (1915)
The Birhors (1925) (a digitized version is available here )
Oraon Religion and Customs (1927)
The Hill Bhuiyas of Orissa (1935)
The Kharias vol.1 (1937)
The Kharias vol.2 (1937)

Journal contributions
Man in India, the first anthropological journal in India was started by him in 1921.
 He wrote extensively on totemism among the Asur, the Ho people of Singhbhum, the Pahira of Chota Nagpur; on the Lepcha funeral; kinship among Sikkimese people, Khasi people; Khond human sacrifice; Korku memorial tablets; black Bhils of Jaisamand lake in Rajputana, and on the ethnic groups of Burma.

Recognition
Kaisar-i-Hind Silver Medal, 1913
Roy Bahadur, 1919
Elected as honorary member of the Folklore Society of London, being the only Indian to be awarded thus
Elected as president of the Anthropological Section in the Indian Science Congress
Elected as president of the Anthropology section of the All India Oriental Conference, 1932
Elected as president of the Folklore section of the All India Oriental Conference, 1933
Elected as member of the Council d'Honour of the International Congress of Ethnological Sciences
Foundation Fellow of National Institute of Sciences
Foundation Fellow of Patna University
The Indian Science Congress awarded him with a commemorative volume of essays in anthropology.
The Sarat Chandra Roy Institute of Anthropological Studies in Ranchi, established in 1979, commemorates his name.

See also
The People of India
Historical definitions of races in India
Anthropological Survey of India
Biraja Sankar Guha
M. N. Srinivas
Nirmal Kumar Bose
Panchanan Mitra
L. P. Vidyarthi

References

1871 births
1942 deaths
Cultural anthropologists
Indian anthropologists
Scottish Church College alumni
Surendranath College alumni
University of Calcutta alumni
Academic staff of the University of Calcutta
Academic staff of Patna University
Indian social sciences writers
20th-century Indian non-fiction writers
19th-century Indian non-fiction writers
People from Khulna District
19th-century Indian social scientists
20th-century Indian social scientists